Amir Said is an engineer at Hewlett Packard Laboratories in Cupertino, California. He was named a Fellow of the Institute of Electrical and Electronics Engineers (IEEE) in 2014 for his contributions to compression and processing of images and videos.

References

Fellow Members of the IEEE
Living people
Year of birth missing (living people)
Place of birth missing (living people)
Hewlett-Packard people
American electrical engineers